A welcome sign (or gateway sign) is a road sign at the border of a jurisdiction or region that introduces or welcomes visitors to the city/county/state/province/prefecture/canton/region.  Examples of welcome signs can be found near political borders, such as when entering a state, province, county, city, or town, and they are increasingly found in neighborhoods and private communities.  In European countries under the Schengen Agreement, a welcome sign may be found at borders between countries. Its purpose is partly informational, to inform drivers where they are, and partly for tourism, as it affords an opportunity to advertise features within the region to people who are entering it.  A welcome sign is a type of town sign—a sign placed at the entrance to and exit from a city, town, or village. In many jurisdictions, the format of town signs is standardized; in some, welcome signs may be distinct from the legally mandated town sign.

A municipality's welcome sign may give its population or date of foundation, list twinned towns or services within the town, or depict the town's crest, typical local products, or the logo of sponsor organizations which maintain the sign (such as the local Lions Club).

Gallery

References

External links 
 

Signage
Street furniture
Tourism
Traffic signs